The Black Bouquet is a fantasy novel by Richard Lee Byers, set in the Forgotten Realms fictional universe. It is the second novel in "The Rogues" series.

Plot summary
A rogue becomes involved in a game where he thought no one would get hurt, trusting a tanarukk bandit and hired for his skill and cunning, but turns an entire city against him.

Publication history
2003, USA, Wizards of the Coast , Pub date 1 September 2003, Paperback.

Reception

References

2003 American novels
American fantasy novels
Forgotten Realms novels